Lappe or Lappé is a German-language surname. Notable people with this surname include:

 Anna Lappé (born 1973), American author and educator
 Benay Lappe (1960), American rabbi 
 Frances Moore Lappé (1944), American researcher and author
 Gemze de Lappe (1922–2017), American dancer
 Jean-Roger Lappé-Lappé (1981), Cameroonian footballer
 Joseph DeLappe (1963), UK-based American artist and academic
 Karl-Heinz Lappe (1987), German footballer 
 Linda Lappe (1980),  American college basketball coach
 Pele de Lappe (1916–2007), American artist

See also
 Lappe, Ontario, unorganized part of Thunder Bay District, Ontario, Canada
 Lapp

References

German-language surnames
Surnames from nicknames